Bayancholi-ye Ajam (also Romanized as Bayāncholī-ye ‘Ajam; also known as Bayāncholī-ye Pā’īn and Bayān Chowlī) is a village in Yowla Galdi Rural District, in the Central District of Showt County, West Azerbaijan Province, Iran. At the 2006 census, its population was 644, in 148 families.

References 

Populated places in Showt County